Jeff Rovin is an American magazine editor, freelance writer, columnist, and author, who has appeared on The New York Times Best Seller list.

Biography
Jeff Rovin has been editor-in-chief of Weekly World News, an assistant editor and writer for DC Comics, and an editor for Warren Publishing and Seaboard Periodicals, as well as a science and media columnist in such magazines as Analog, Omni, and Famous Monsters of Filmland.

His How to Play video game books of the 1980s and 1990s detailed strategies for dozens of games for the Nintendo Entertainment System, Sega Genesis, and Game Boy. This series was preceded by his The Complete Guide to Conquering Video Games in 1982, and followed by his Gamemaster series that lasted until the late 1990s, which began containing a violence rating for the games included in these books. Rovin's publisher at the time, St. Martin's, later decided to continue the "How To Win At", series, but this time written by Hank Schlesinger, to cover Nintendo 64, PlayStation games, and Pokémon.

Rovin has written encyclopedias about popular culture, including The Encyclopedia of Superheroes (Facts On File, 1985), The Encyclopedia of Super Villains (Facts On File, 1987) The Illustrated Encyclopedia of Cartoon Animals (Prentice Hall, 1991), and The Encyclopedia of Monsters (Checkmark Books, 1990). He has worked on biographical and film books on such performers as Kelsey Grammer, Lana Turner, Adam West, Ellen DeGeneres, Jackie Chan, Charlton Heston, Elvis Presley, Sylvester Stallone, Richard Pryor, Luke Perry, Jason Priestley, and Julio Iglesias, and on the animated series The Simpsons. Additionally, he has written quiz and joke books.

Rovin's novels are in the fields of thriller, horror, adventure, and mystery, in addition to the military field with books in the Force Five and Tom Clancy's Op-Center series. His Tom Clancy's Op-Center: War of Eagles became a New York Times Best Seller.

His later Unit Omega books were written under the name pen name Jim Grand. He then began writing further military suspense novels under his own name, such as Tempest Down, Dead Rising, and Rogue Angel.

In October 2016, during the last days of the Donald Trump campaign, Rovin appeared on Hannity, in Breitbart News and the front cover of National Enquirer, claiming to have been a "fixer" for Bill and Hillary Clinton, hiding family scandals. His allegations included that Hillary Clinton was "bisexual" and a "secret sex freak" with an "open marriage" and had a romantic relationship with Vince Foster.

Bibliography

Fiction

Stand-alone novels
The Hindenburg Disaster (1975)
The Transgalactic Guide To Solar System M-17 (1981)
The Madjan (1984)
Dagger (1988)
Starik (1989) - with Sander Diamond
The Red Arrow (1990) - with Sander Diamond
Cat Angels (1995)
Vespers (1999) - based on his screenplay of the same name. 
Stealth War (2000)
Fatalis (2000) - based on his screenplay of the same name. 
Dead Rising (2005)
Tempest Down (2007)
Rogue Angel (2007)
The Devil's Rangers (2007) - written under the pen name Jim Grand
Conversations with the Devil (2013)
Coldwater (2015)
Zero-G (2016) - with William Shatner

Hollywood Detective
 Garrison (1975)
 The Wolf (1975)

Novelizations and tie-ins
April Fool's Day (1986)
Re-Animator (1987)
Cliffhanger (1993)
Mortal Kombat (1995) - original novel based on the video game
Broken Arrow (1996)
The Game (1997)
Return of the Wolf Man (1998) - original novel based on the Universal Monsters

Force Five
 Destination: Algiers (1989)
 Destination: Stalingrad (1989)
 Destination: Norway (1989)

Tom Clancy's Op-Center
Series created by Tom Clancy and Steve Pieczenik
 Op-Center (1995)
 Mirror Image (1995)
 Games of State (1996)
 Acts of War (1997)
 Balance of Power (1998)
 State of Siege (1999)
 Divide and Conquer (2000)
 Line of Control (2001)
 Mission of Honor (2002)
 Sea of Fire (2003)
 Call to Treason (2004)
 War of Eagles (2005)
For Honor (2018)
Sting of the Wasp (2019)
God of War (2020)The Black Order (2021)Call of Duty (2022)

Unit Omega
written under the pen name Jim Grand
 Unit Omega (2003)
 Operation Medusa (2004)

The EarthEnd Saga
Co-written with actress Gillian Anderson
 A Vision of Fire (2014)
 A Dream of Ice (2015)
 The Sound of Seas (2016)

Nonfiction
Of Mice and Mickey (1975)
A Pictorial History of Science Fiction Films (1976)
From Jules Verne to Star Trek (1977)
The Fabulous Fantasy Films (1977)
Mars! (1978)
The Fantasy Almanac (1979)
The Signet Book of Movie Lists (1979)
The Science Fiction Collector's Catalog (1982)
TV Babylon (1984)
The Encyclopedia of Superheroes (1985)
The Encyclopedia of Super Villains (1987)
The Encyclopedia of Monsters (1990)
The Spirits of America (1990)
The Illustrated Encyclopedia of Cartoon Animals (1991)
Laws of Order: A Book of Hierarchies, Rankings, Infrastructures, Measurements, and Sizes (1992)
The Laserdisc Film Guide: Complete Ratings for the Best and Worst Movies Available on Disc (1993)
Adventure Heroes: Legendary Characters from Odysseus to James Bond (1995)
The Book of Dumb Movie Blurbs (1996)
Aliens, Robots, and Spaceships (1996)
The Book of Dinosaurs
The Book of TV Lists
Country Music Babylon
Did You Ever Wonder; Why Do Cowboys Wear High Heels?; Who Put Boys in Blue and Girls in Pink?; Are Bats Really Blind?
Fascinating Facts from the Bible
From the Land Beyond Beyond
The Great Television Series
Movie Special Effects
The Second Book of Movie Lists
Simpson Fever!
Sports Babylon, (With Steve Burkow)
TV Babylon 2
The Unbelievable Truth
What's the Difference?; A Compendium of Commonly Confused and Misused Words

Biographies
From the Land Beyond Beyond: The films of Willis O'Brien and Ray Harryhausen (1977)
The Films of Charlton Heston (1977)
Always, Lana (1982) - with Taylor Pero
Richard Pryor, Black and Blue (1984)
Joan Collins: The Unauthorized Biography (1984)
Julio! (1985)
Stallone!: A Hero's Story An Unauthorized Biography (1987)
Luke-Mania! Jason-Fever! (1991)
The World According to Elvis (1992)
Back to the Batcave (1994) - with Adam West
Ellen DeGeneres Up Close: The Unauthorized Biography of the Hot New Star of ABC's Ellen (1994) - with Kathy Tracy
The Essential Jackie Chan (1997) - with Kathy Tracy

Humor and trivia
In Search of Trivia (1984)
1,001 Great One-Liners (1989)
500 Hilarious Jokes for Kids (1990)
The First Good News/Bad News Joke Book (1993)
500 Great Doctor Jokes
500 Great Lawyer Jokes
500 More Hilarious Jokes for Kids
1,001 Great Jokes
1,001 More Great Jokes
1,001 Great Pet Jokes
1,001 Great Sports Jokes
Dinomite Dinousaur Jokes
Don't Even Think About Telling this Joke at Work (writing as Harry Bergen)
Don't Even Think About Telling this Joke to a Lawyer (writing as Harry Bergen)
Goldie's Lox and the Three Bagels (writing as Jeffrey and Lila Dubinsky)
Mother Gooseberg's Book of Jewish Nursery Rhymes (writing as Jeffrey and Lila Dubinsky)
The Second Good News/Bad News Joke Book
Winning at Trivial Pursuit
Count Dracula's Vampire Quiz Book
The Supernatural Movie Quizbook
The Superhero Movie and TV Quiz Book
The UFO Movie Quizbook
The Unauthorized Teenage Mutant Ninja Turtles Quiz Book

Video game books
The Complete Guide to Conquering Video Games: How to Win Every Game in the Galaxy (1982)
How to Win at Nintendo (1988)
How to Win at Nintendo Games 2 (1989)
How to Win at Nintendo Games 3 (1990)
How to Win at Nintendo Sports Games (1990)
How to Win at Super Mario Bros. Games (1990)
How to Win at Sega & Genesis Games (1991)
How to Win at Game Boy Games (1991)
How to Win at Super Nintendo Entertainment System Games (1992)
The Best of How to Win at Nintendo Games (1993)
Gamemaster: Conquering Super Nintendo Games (1994)
Gamemaster: Conquering Sega Genesis Games (1994)
Gamemaster: The Complete Video Game Guide 1995 (1994)
How to Win at Nintendo Games #4

References

External links

1951 births
Living people
20th-century American novelists
21st-century American novelists
20th-century American male writers
21st-century American male writers
American comics writers
American critics
American horror writers
American male novelists
American male short story writers
American mystery writers
Comic book editors
Video game critics
Writers from Brooklyn
Tom Clancy's Op-Center
Hillary Clinton
Novelists from New York (state)
Donald Trump 2016 presidential campaign